Theodore Allen may refer to:

 Theodore Allen (saloon keeper) (1833–?), American gambler, political organizer, saloon keeper and head of a criminal family in New York City
 Theodore W. Allen (1919–2005), American intellectual, writer, and activist
 Theo Allen (1914–2003), New Zealand middle-distance runner